On the ancient Roman calendar, mensis Iunius or Iunius, also Junius (June), was the fourth month, following Maius (May).  In the oldest calendar attributed by the Romans to Romulus, Iunius was the fourth month in a ten-month year that began with March (Martius, "Mars' month"). The month following June was thus called Quinctilis or Quintilis, the "fifth" month. Iunius had 29 days until a day was added during the Julian reform of the calendar in the mid-40s BC. The month that followed Iunius was renamed Iulius (July) in honour of Julius Caesar.

Name of the month
In his poem on the Roman calendar, Ovid has three goddesses present three different derivations of the name Iunius. Juno asserts that the month is named for her. Juventas ("Youth") pairs Iunius with Maius: the former, she says, comes from junior, "a younger person", in contrast to maiores or the "elders" for whom May was named. Juno's own name may derive from the same root meaning "young", and these two possibilities may be reconcilable. Ovid has Concordia claim that Iunius comes from iungo, iunctus, "join", in honor of her uniting the Romans and the Sabines. Elsewhere, an even less likely derivation relates the month name to Marcus Iunius Brutus, a member of the gens Iunia who made the first sacrifice to Dea Carna on the Kalends (June 1).

Iconography

Month illustrations that draw on the Calendar of Filocalus (354 AD) show a nude male holding a torch that may be an allegory of the summer solstice. Solstitium is noted on June 24 of the calendar. The torch may be a reference to dies lampadarum, "day of torches", variously interpreted as the sun's rays or as the torch of Ceres, the grain goddess who carried a torch while searching for her abducted daughter Proserpina. The solstice marked the beginning of the harvest, which is represented by the basket of fruit and a sickle. The plant may be a bean, since June 1 was the "Bean Kalends".

Dates
The Romans did not number days of a month sequentially from the 1st through the last day. Instead, they counted back from the three fixed points of the month: the Nones (5th or 7th, depending on the length of the month), the Ides (13th or 15th), and the Kalends (1st) of the following month. The Nones of June was the 5th, and the Ides the 13th. Roman counting was inclusive; June 9 was ante diem V Idūs Iunias, "the 5th day before the Ides of June," usually abbreviated a.d. V Id. Iun. (or with the a.d. omitted altogether). The last day of June was the pridie Kalendas Quinctilis (pridie Kalendas Iulias after July was renamed), "day before the Kalends of July". The modern equivalent of this date was June 29 on the pre-Julian calendar, but June 30 on the Julian, because June was one of the months to which a day was added in realigning with astronomical time. June 23 was thus VIII Kal. Quinct., "the 8th day before the Kalends of Quinctilis", during the Republican era, but IX Kal. Iul., "the 9th day before the Kalends of July", in the Imperial era. 

On the calendar of the Republic and early Principate, each day was marked with a letter to denote its religiously lawful status. In June, these were:
 F for dies fasti, days when it was legal to initiate action in the courts of civil law;
 C for dies comitalis, a day on which the Roman people could hold assemblies (comitia), elections, and certain kinds of judicial proceedings;
 N for dies nefasti, when these political activities and the administration of justice were prohibited;
 NP, the meaning of which remains elusive, but which marked feriae, public holidays.
By the late 2nd century AD, extant calendars no longer show days marked with these letters, probably in part as a result of calendar reforms undertaken by Marcus Aurelius. Varro specifies the act of sweeping '.

Days were also marked with nundinal letters in cycles of A B C D E F G H, to mark the "market week" (these are omitted in the table below).

Festivals marked in large letters on extant , represented by festival names in all capital letters on the table, are thought to have been the most ancient holidays, becoming part of the calendar before 509 BC. A dies natalis was an anniversary such as a temple founding or rededication, sometimes thought of as the "birthday" of a deity. 

Unless otherwise noted, the dating and observances on the following table are from H.H. Scullard, Festivals and Ceremonies of the Roman Republic. Scullard places the Taurian Games on June 25–26 on a five-year cycle, but other scholars believe these ludi had no regular date and were held as a crisis ritual when needed. After the Ides, dual dates are given to represent both the earlier calendar, when June had 29 days and July was called Quinctilis, and the 30-day month of  the Julian calendar.

References

June
Months of the Roman calendar
Juno (mythology)